Hridayam is a 2022 Indian Malayalam-language coming-of-age romantic drama film written and directed by Vineeth Sreenivasan. It was produced by Visakh Subramaniam through Merryland Cinemas and co-produced by Noble Babu Thomas through Big Bang Entertainments. The film stars Pranav Mohanlal, Kalyani Priyadarshan and Darshana Rajendran. The film's songs and background score was composed by Hesham Abdul Wahab.

Hridayam marks the return of Merryland Studio, one of the earliest film studios in Kerala, into film production. The film reintroduced once obsolete audio cassettes and limited edition vinyl records in India. Principal photography began in February 2020, after taking a break with the surge of COVID-19 pandemic in India, filming was concluded in March 2021. The film was shot at KCG College of Technology in Chennai, where Vineeth, his wife Divya and his friend and actor Aju Varghese studied, and in Palakkad, Kochi, and Andhra Pradesh.

Hridayam was released in theatres worldwide on 21 January 2022. It received critical acclaim from critics, who praised the direction, story, screenplay, music, score and cast's performances (particularly Pranav Mohanlal, Darshana Rajendran and Kalyani Priyadarshan). The film grossed over  worldwide, becoming the 3rd highest grossing Malayalam film of the year. The film won two Kerala State Film Awards, including Best Film with Popular Appeal and Aesthetic Value. The film was one of the top rated Indian movies of 2022, by the Internet Movie Database (IMDB).

Plot
Arun Neelakandan, a teenager from Kerala, joins KC Tech, a popular engineering college in Chennai for his graduation. He falls in love with college sweetheart Darshana at the first sight. They grow closer after Arun is ragged by his seniors, but a few scuffles and incidents get the seniors suspended and they start dating. Arun accompanies his friend Antony to meet his online girlfriend, and feels attracted to her colleague. He lies to her, states he is single and they lean in for a kiss but they are interrupted by moral police. A guilt-ridden Arun confesses to Darshana, who lividly calls off the relationship. In the heat of their argument, they challenge each other that they will have other romantic partners better than each other.

Arun's life goes downhill after the breakup. He takes to ragging juniors and thrashing up other people and outsiders in his second year and is addicted to alcohol. He begins a relationship with Maya but doesn't find himself happy. Meanwhile, Darshana starts dating Kedar, a womanizer. He warns Darshana but she ignores it as a sign of jealousy. However, Arun is proven right and Darshana slaps Kedar. Kedar threatens to spread rumours about her, and her friend convey this to and Arun beats Kedar up and silences him. At home, Arun's parents notice something is wrong with their son. His father advices him to quit alcohol and turn over a new leaf in his life.

Arun moves out of his shared hostel room to a more peaceful atmosphere. He joins their classmate Selva's coaching classes along with Antony and they soon rebound in academics, with Arun being fifth in class, and both clearing many of their exams. Later, Darshana too joins Selva's coaching class and finds herself liking the newly changed Arun. Selva dies in a bus accident and everyone in his class is grief-stricken. Maya calls off her relationship with Arun after her father's death, realizing that Arun does not love her but only wanted her to make Darshana jealous. On the last day of college, all students are led into a room called "the secret alley," (which was shown in their first year and they learned that only the final year students can see what it is on their final day) where they leave a message for the next batch of students. However, Arun finds himself unable to write anything. Darshana, who accompanies Arun to his train, asks him if they would have still been together if not for the argument four years ago. He does not have an answer.

After graduation, Arun gets a job in a campus interview. Two years later, Arun feels dissatisfied with his job and leaves it. Darshana, now a YouTube vlogger, advises him to pursue his dreams. On a bus journey, he meets Jimmy, a wedding photographer who is in need of a partner, drags him to photography. Arun decides that they should be a company that specialises in intimate weddings since no such brand currently exists in Kerala. He gets their company a shoutout from Prateek Tiwari, his batchmate at KC Tech who, is now a popular Bollywood singer. After the shoutout, they get lots of bookings and enquiries and they become famous and Arun now feels satisfied with what he is doing.

During one of such weddings, Arun sees Nithya Balagopal and feels instantly attracted to her. Impressed with his photographs, Nithya recommends Arun to her cousin, who is about to be married. However, Arun discovers that the groom is Kedar and exposes his character to Nithya. The wedding is called off and Nithya is grateful to Arun for saving her cousin's life. They grow closer and Nithya accompanies Arun to Chennai, for a wedding and back to the terrace where Selva held his coaching classes, but unfortunately now locked up after arrival of new tenants.

With their parents' approval, Nithya and Arun fix their marriage. Darshana attends the wedding reception but finds herself unable to come to terms with the fact Arun can no longer be hers and leaves in tears. Arun and Nithya get married and live happily thereafter. Three years later, Nithya gives birth to a baby boy. A joyous Arun feels like telling Darshana the news first. Arun remembers Selva and name his son as Selva as a memory, to which Nithya becomes happy.

Darshana's marriage is fixed, and Arun and Nitya along with Selva go to her place for the same, but Darshana, who still has feelings for Arun, acts too close around him, which irks Nithya. That night, she calls him to meet at the same place they confessed to each other, the beach. Arun tries to secretly leave but Nithya wakes up and he lies to her saying that they have a bachelorette party for her and leaves. But Arun feels guilty and goes to the room to find Nithya in a sad state realising that he lied. He confesses that he is going to meet Darshana. She allows him and she goes back to sleep peacefully with Selva. Darshana, who is due to get married the next day, expresses her reservations about marriage to Arun, and asks him once again if they would have still been together were it not for the argument. Arun tells her to stop thinking about the what-ifs and look forward to her future and they tearfully embrace. Darshana gets married.

While in Chennai, Arun takes a detour to KC Tech and gets the key to the secret alley. He writes a thank you note to the college for making him who he is and exits the campus, where he, Nithya and Selva return home.

Cast

Production

Development
Hridayam was officially announced in December 2019, set to be produced by Visakh Subramaniam and co-produced by Noble Babu Thomas, starring Pranav Mohanlal, Kalyani Priyadarshan, and Darshana Rajendran, intended to be released during Onam 2020. The film marks the comeback of film studio Merryland Studio into film production after a hiatus of 30 years, under the new company Merryland Cinemas. Vineeth told in an interview that the characters in the film draws inspiration from moments and memories from his and his wife's lives and their friends' from college and life beyond that. According to Vineeth, Hridayam is about a young man named Arun Neelakandan and "tracks his journey right from when he was 17 to 30 years old. We have tried to convey the various highs and lows in his life, his friendships, love, emotional ups and downs, career-related uncertainties, up to the time he is about to be a family man". He described the film as a coming-of-age drama. Talking about how much of his real-life is presented in the film, Vineeth said that it is "based on a lot of incidents that happened during my college life in Chennai. The first half of the film is a cinematic dramatisation of real-life events. Thattathin Marayathu is a campus I am not familiar with. But this is home". About casting Pranav, Vineeth said that he liked him from Aadhi, there was something special about his eyes and smile in it, and that he wanted a charmer rather than an accomplished actor, like Suriya in Vaaranam Aayiram or Logan Lerman in The Perks of Being a Wallflower.

Filming
The film began principal photography in early February 2020. After a schedule in Kochi, filming was shifted to Kollengode, Palakkad for a two-day schedule. The film's main location was Chennai. Filming was paused in March 2020 due to a 21-day COVID-19 lockdown in India. By then about 50 percent of the film was complete, primarily featuring Pranav and Darshana. Filming was put on hold indefinitely after the surge of COVID-19 pandemic. It was resumed in January 2021. Kalyani joined the sets. Vineeth recalled in an interview that he never saw Pranav reading his dialogues on location as he would have learned it by rote. Significant parts of the film takes place in a college. It was shot at KCG College of Technology in Chennai, where Vineeth and his wife studied. That schedule was concluded in Kochi on 21 January. Vineeth said that Hridayam gave him the most fun working in a film since Thattathin Marayathu. For certain scenes,Rohit [A.D.F Of Mumbai] made the actors listen to music to get them feel the mood of the scene. Another schedule in Chennai was concluded on 11 February, about 95 percent of the film was complete by then. Principal photography was complete by mid-March, with one song remaining to be shot with limited crew. The film, which was originally charted to shoot for 100 days in multiple schedules was able to complete in 60 or more days. The follow-up 5-day song shoot was held in July 2021 in Andhra Pradesh. Post-production of the film was completed by October 2021.

Music

The music for the film was composed by Hesham Abdul Wahab. In early 2020, Vineeth went to Istanbul to record pieces of music for the film. Actor Prithviraj Sukumaran has sung a song for the film. Beside acting, Darshana Rajendran has sung the track "Darshana". The track list was revealed on 21 June 2021 on the occasion of World music day. Audio mastering of the film was completed by September 2021. Audio rights of the movie was acquired by Think Music. Hridayam is bringing back audio cassettes and limited edition vinyl records back to India, which was a dream shared by Vineeth, Hesham, and Think Music executives. Since its production was obsolete in the country, Think Music had to partner with a cassette manufacturer in Japan to import its physical copies to India.

Release

Theatrical
When the filming was through midway in March 2020, the producers announced that the film will have a theatrical release. In October 2021, it was announced along with the song "Darshana" that the film will have a worldwide theatrical release on 21 January 2022.

Home media 
Disney+ Hotstar has acquired the film's post-theatrical digital distribution and was premiered on 18 February 2022. and Satellite rights bagged by Asianet

Reception

Box office 

Critical response 
It received mostly positive reviews from critics. Rating 3 out of 5 stars, The New Indian Express said that "Vineeth Sreenivasan has structured Hridayam in a way that makes it seem like you're watching two feel-good films for the price of one", and that the film has a therapeutic quality that "makes you feel less embarrassed about the awkward, foolish things you did in the past", and "as a coming-of-age drama, Hridayam is to Vineeth Sreenivasan what Premam was to Alphonse Puthren. (If given a choice, I would easily pick Hridayam over Premam). It's one of those films I wanted to hug once the end credits started rolling", also praised the casting. The Times of India gave a rating of 3.5 on 5 and wrote "Hridayam tries to give a realistic, coming-of-age depiction of a Malayali's campus life in Chennai and those who have done engineering in the city might connect with it the best, thanks to the different moods, flavours and vibes of the city woven into the narrative in a hearty manner ... The movie has an interesting emotional core, brought out by performances of Pranav, Darshana and others, which makes gentle tugs at the viewers' heartstrings". The Week also rated 3.5 out of 5, called it "a coming-of-age drama high on emotions" and stated that "Vineeth Srinivasan is back with a feel-good, new-age drama that most youngsters can relate to ... Arun is safe in the hands of Pranav, who has indeed grown as an actor", also praised the music and cinematography.

The Quint rated the film 2.5 on 5 and  wrote that "Hridayam is Vineeth's labour of love, a tribute to his campus life"; the film is "a fun-filled coming-of-age drama set in a typical engineering college campus; of love, break-ups, heartaches and the discovery of life in the process, also spilling over to the next phase of the lives of the protagonists", concluding that "Hridayam is eminently watchable and you are sure to leave cinemas with a lighter heart after watching it". Pinkvilla rated the film 3.5 on 5 and described the film "a marvelously structured memory piece on soul searching", saying "Hridayam is a gigantic, ambitious puzzle of a narrative, built confidently around a certain time in a person's life that informs the type of person that you turn out to be in the future. The screenplay is infused with fifteen songs yet the interlacing works for the nature of the story, a character driven memory piece as opposed to a plot heavy drama". Manorama Online wrote that "there is romance, friendship, heartbreak, pathos, and life in Hridayam. That's Hridayam in very simple terms. A beautiful gift during these trying times ... One can't even visualise any other actor in place of Arun Neelakandan. Pranav has come a long way since his first film. His charm is undeniable. And that's exactly what makes us warm up to Arun Neelakandan".

Accolades

References

External links

2020s Malayalam-language films
Films directed by Vineeth Sreenivasan
2020s coming-of-age drama films
Indian coming-of-age drama films
Coming-of-age romance films
Indian musical drama films
Films shot in Kochi
Films shot in Palakkad
Films shot in Chennai
Films about Indian weddings
Films about students
Films about marriage